Joaquín Nicolás Mendive (born 8 August 1996) is an Argentine professional footballer who plays as a goalkeeper for Huracán.

Career
Mendive had spells with Tristán Suárez and All Boys early in his youth career, before heading to Huracán in February 2016. He made first-team teamsheets in mid-2017, going unused on the bench for Copa Sudamericana second stage games with Paraguay's Libertad. Likewise happened six further times in all competitions, prior to the goalkeeper departing on loan in July 2019 to Sacachispas. He made his senior debut on 7 September, featuring in a Primera B Metropolitana loss away to ex-club Tristán Suárez. Mendive featured twenty-one times before the season's curtailment due to the COVID-19 pandemic.

Career statistics
.

Notes

References

External links

1996 births
Living people
People from Ezeiza, Buenos Aires
Argentine footballers
Association football goalkeepers
Primera B Metropolitana players
Club Atlético Huracán footballers
Sacachispas Fútbol Club players
Sportspeople from Buenos Aires Province